Dombay (Dommay) is an urban locality (a resort settlement) under the administrative jurisdiction of the town of republic significance of Karachayevsk in the Karachay-Cherkess Republic, Russia. As of the 2010 Census, its population was 657.

Geography
Dombay is situated within the Teberda Nature Reserve (zapovednik) and is a tourist destination.

History
Urban-type settlement status was granted to Dombay in 1965.

After the incident made international headlines, Russian authorities called for tougher safety laws.

Administrative and municipal status
Within the framework of administrative divisions, the resort settlement of Dombay is subordinated to the town of republic significance of Karachayevsk. Within the framework of municipal divisions, Dombay is a part of Karachayevsky Urban Okrug.

References

Notes

Sources

Urban-type settlements in the Karachay-Cherkess Republic
Ski areas and resorts in Russia